Trezvant is a surname. Notable people with the surname include:

James Trezvant (died 1841), American politician
John Trezvant (born 1964), American basketball player